Martha Canga Antonio (born 1995), is a Belgian actress and songstress of Angolan descent. She is best known for the critically acclaimed film Black.

Personal life
She was born in 1995 in Mons, Belgium to Angolan parents. She grew up in Liège and currently lives in Mechelen.

Career
In 2014, she studied communication management at Erasmushogeschool, Brussels. During this period, she was selected to play the character 'Mavela' in the gang thriller film Black directed by Adil El Arbi and Bilall Fallah. She was selected to the character from 450 candidates. Before the film, she had no acting experience. However she played the role which became highly popular and critically acclaimed. The film was later screened different international film festivals. In November 2015, Martha was adjudged the Best Actress at the Tallinn Black Nights Film Festival. In December of same year, she was nominated as a European Shooting Star at the 7th Magritte Awards for the same film.

Apart from acting, she is also a prolific singer who started career as a member of the musical group Soul'Art. In 2018, she started her career as a solo singer under the name 'Martha Da'ro' and released the single Summer Blues.

Filmography

See also
 Shooting Stars Award

References

External links
 

Living people
Belgian people of Angolan descent
Belgian film actresses
Belgian television actresses
1995 births
21st-century Belgian actresses
21st-century Belgian women singers
21st-century Belgian singers
People from Mons
Actors from Liège
Musicians from Liège